Hörning is a German-language surname. Notable people with the surname include:
 Alphonse Hörning, Swiss bobsledder
 Dan Hörning (born 1970), Swedish historical fantasy author
 Walo Hörning (1910–1986), Swiss fencer

See also 
 Horning (surname) 
 Hornung

German-language surnames